The 1851 Research Fellowship is a scheme conducted by the Royal Commission for the Exhibition of 1851 to annually award a three-year research scholarship to approximately eight "young scientists or engineers of exceptional promise". The fellowship is open to all nationalities and fields of science, including physical or biological sciences, mathematics, applied science, and any branch of engineering. The fellowship can be held anywhere in the United Kingdom.

Several other Fellowships are also awarded by the Royal Commission for the Exhibition of 1851, including the Research Fellowship in the Built Environment, Industrial Fellowships and the Research Fellowship in Design.

Alumni
The research fellowship known as the 1851 Exhibition Scholarship, has been awarded to numerous scientists and engineers over the years, many of whom have become leaders in their fields.

Award recipients include:
Herbert E. Watson, Ramsey Professor in Chemical Engineering at University College London
Charles Glover Barkla, English physicist and winner of the Nobel Prize in Physics in 1917.
Noel Benson, a research geologist and academic
Homi J. Bhabha, "father" of India's nuclear programme
Sydney Brenner, British biologist/geneticist and winner of Nobel Prize in Physiology or Medicine
Eric Burhop, Australian physicist
Kelvin Campbell, South African / English urban designer, originator of 'Massive Small Theory'
Roger Cashmore, English physicist
James Chadwick, English physicist and winner of the Nobel Prize in Physics
Hans Thacher Clarke, English-born biochemist who distinguished himself as University professor and Kodak researcher in the United States
John Cockcroft, English physicist and winner of the Nobel Prize for Physics
John Cornforth, Australian chemist and winner of the Nobel Prize for Chemistry
Paul Dirac, English physicist and winner of the Nobel Prize in Physics
Austin Burton Edwards, Australian geologist
Alice Laura Embleton (1876–1960), biologist, zoologist and suffragist.
Charles Goodeve, Canadian chemist
Brian Grieve, Australian botanist
George Harker, Australian scientist
Rita Harradence, Australian chemist
Peter Higgs, British physicist and winner of the Nobel Prize in Physics
Edwin Sherbon Hills, Australian geologist
Fred Hoyle, British astronomer noted primarily for the theory of stellar nucleosynthesis and coining the term "Big Bang"
Aaron Klug, winner of the Nobel Prize in Chemistry
June Lascelles, Australian microbiologist
Geoff Malcolm, New Zealand physical chemist
Leslie Martin, Australian physicist
Harrie Massey, Australian physicist
Thomas E. Nevin, Irish physicist
Mark Oliphant, Australian physicist
Cormac O'Ceallaigh, Irish physicist
J. R. Partington, British chemist
Joseph Pawsey, Australian radio astronomer
William Penney, Baron Penney, English physicist
Sir Robert Howson Pickard (1896), British chemist; Vice-Chancellor of the University of London
Kathleen Prendergast, Australian paleontologist
Darshan Ranganathan, Indian chemist
Robert Robinson, English chemist and winner of the Nobel Prize in Chemistry
Alistair Rowe, Australian Physicist
Ernest Rutherford, New Zealand physicist and winner of the Nobel Prize in Chemistry
Bernice Weldon Sargent, Canadian physicist
Winifred Smith, English botanist
Alexander Todd, Nobel Prize for Chemistry
Ernest Walton, Nobel Prize for Physics

References

External links
 Royal Commission for the Exhibition of 1851 Research Fellowships

Scholarships in the United Kingdom
Fellowships